Calyptostoma is a genus of mites in the family Calyptostomatidae. There are about six described species in Calyptostoma.

Species
These six species belong to the genus Calyptostoma:
 Calyptostoma giuliae Haitlinger & Šundić, 2015
 Calyptostoma gorganica Saboori & Soukhstaraii, 2012
 Calyptostoma latiseta Shiba, 1976
 Calyptostoma marantica Haitlinger & Šundić, 2015
 Calyptostoma simplexa Shiba, 1976
 Calyptostoma velutinum (Müller, 1776)

References

Further reading

 

Trombidiformes genera